Graham High School is a high school located in Graham, North Carolina.

About
Graham High School is a comprehensive, four-year high school serving the city of Graham. It is one of six traditional high schools in the Alamance-Burlington School System. Graham High School is accredited by The Southern Association of Colleges and Secondary Schools and the North Carolina State Department of Public Instruction. Student enrollment in grades 9–12 is approximately 830. The mascot is the Red Devils. Bear Bryant is the principal and has served as principal since 2019. Kyle Ward is the athletic director.
Graham High School is located at 903 Trollinger Road. It opened its doors in the fall of 1968. The building was formerly known as Central High School from 1961 to 1968.

Notable alumni
 Jane Albright, former women's college basketball coach
 Jim Holt, former Major League Baseball player
 John Isley, radio host with comedic program The John Boy & Billy Big Show
 Jamie Newman, NFL player

References

External links 
 Website

Public high schools in North Carolina
Schools in Alamance County, North Carolina